B.B. King (1925–2015) was an American blues musician whose recording career spanned 1949–2008. As with other blues contemporaries, King's material was primarily released on singles until the late 1950s–early 1960s, when long playing record albums became more popular.

Overview 
B.B. King's first charting single, "3 O'Clock Blues," reached No. 1 on the Billboard R&B charts in 1951. He charted further No. 1 singles on various Billboard R&B charts with "You Know I Love You," "Please Love Me" and "You Upset Me Baby." Between 1958 and 1974 he had 10 top 10 hits on the R&B chart, including "Sweet Sixteen," "Chains And Things," "I Like To Live the Love" and one of his most well-known hits, "The Thrill Is Gone." King had 32 charting singles on the Billboard Hot 100 from 1964 to 1989. His final chart entry on the Hot 100 was a 1989 collaboration with U2 on "When Love Comes To Town."

King charted 25 albums on the Billboard Blues Albums chart which ties him with Joe Bonamassa for the most charted albums. Between 1968 and 2008, he attained 33 charting albums on the Billboard 200. His highest-charting album was his 2000 album with Eric Clapton titled Riding With the King, peaking at No. 3.

Studio albums

Modern Records (with Crown and Kent subsidiaries)

ABC Records (and BluesWay subsidiary) then MCA Records and Geffen Records

Live albums

Major compilation albums

Singles

Bullet Records

Modern Records (with RPM and Kent subsisiaries)

ABC Records (and BluesWay subsidiary)

Billboard Year-End performances

Other appearances

Notes and references

Notes

Matrix numbers

References

Discographies of American artists
Blues discographies
Discography